Christopher Kubasik, also known as Chris Kubasik (born 1963), is an American author of several role-playing games, sourcebooks, adventures and fiction novels set in them, and has created his own TV series.

Career
Kubasik worked at FASA Corporation for five years from 1987-1992. Kubasik has contributed to Earthdawn, BattleTech, Shadowrun, Star Wars, TORG, and Advanced Dungeons & Dragons role-playing games. He has written tie-in novels for Earthdawn, BattleTech and Shadowrun. Greg Gorden designed the rules for Earthdawn, while Kubasik created the world for the game.

Kubasik has done screenwriting for New Line Cinema. In 2006 he worked as the Head Writer for the Internet show "Stranger Adventures," which was nominated for three Emmy Awards for Broadband Entertainment in 2006.  He also was the creator and head writer of the television series The Booth At The End.  In 2008, he compared the Internet's effect on film-making to the Wild West, saying "It's like we are in California 100 years ago, with a movie camera and a tent setting up on the side of a river, saying: 'OK, what are we going to shoot today?'"

Works
Battletech novels
Ideal War, 1993, 
Earthdawn novels
 The Longing Ring, 1993, 
 Mother Speaks, 1994, 
 Poisoned Memories, 1994, 
Shadowrun novels
 Changeling, 1992, 
Torg supplements
 The Living Land, 1990
 The Destiny Map, 1990

References

External links

1963 births
20th-century American male writers
20th-century American novelists
American male novelists
Dungeons & Dragons game designers
Living people
Place of birth missing (living people)
Role-playing game writers